Oak Orchard may refer to the following places in the United States:

In New York
Oak Orchard Creek, a tributary of Lake Ontario
Oak Orchard State Marine Park, located at the mouth of Oak Orchard Creek
Oak Orchard Wildlife Management Area, located along Oak Orchard Creek
Carlton, New York, a town in Orleans County, formerly called the Town of Oak Orchard
Iroquois National Wildlife Refuge, formerly known as Oak Orchard National Wildlife Refuge

Elsewhere
Oak Orchard, Delaware an unincorporated community
Oak Orchard, Wisconsin, an unincorporated community